Norman Wayne Robinson (April 1, 1913 – March 26, 1984) was an American Negro league outfielder for the Baltimore Elite Giants and Birmingham Black Barons between 1940 and 1952.

A native of Oklahoma City, Oklahoma, Robinson was the brother of fellow Negro leaguer Frazier Robinson, and played for Birmingham in the 1948 Negro World Series. He died in Pacoima, California in 1984 at age 70.

References

External links
 and Seamheads
 Norman Robinson at Negro Leagues Baseball Museum
 Bobby Robinson biography from Society for American Baseball Research (SABR)

1913 births
1984 deaths
Baltimore Elite Giants players
Birmingham Black Barons players
Baseball outfielders
20th-century African-American sportspeople